Olisa "Ollie" Morah (born 3 September 1972) was a footballer who played for Hereford United, Cambridge United and Torquay United. As a schoolboy, he went to the FA School of Excellence at Lilleshall and represented England.

Currently, he is the Games & PE teacher at Loyola Prep School (Buckhurst Hill, Essex.)

References

Living people
Hereford United F.C. players
Sutton United F.C. players
Cambridge United F.C. players
Torquay United F.C. players
Welling United F.C. players
Tottenham Hotspur F.C. players
Swindon Town F.C. players
1972 births
English footballers
Association football forwards